The 2010 Comerica Bank Challenger was a professional tennis tournament played on hard court. This was the twenty-third edition of the tournament which is part of the 2010 ATP Challenger Tour. It took place in Aptos, United States between 12 July and 18 July 2010.

Singles main draw entrants

Seeds

 Rankings are as of July 5, 2010.

Other entrants
The following players received wildcards into the singles main draw:
  Devin Britton
  Chase Buchanan
  Daniel Kosakowski
  Bradley Klahn

The following players received a place as a special entrant:
  Richard Bloomfield

The following players received entry from the qualifying draw:
  Karol Beck
  Dayne Kelly
  Brydan Klein
  Artem Sitak

Champions

Singles

 Marinko Matosevic def.  Donald Young, 6–4, 6–2

Doubles

 Carsten Ball /  Chris Guccione def.  Adam Feeney /  Greg Jones, 6–1, 6–3

References
Official website
ITF Search 

Comerica Bank Challenger
Nordic Naturals Challenger
Com